Mount Koma or Hakone Komagatake, with the altitude of 1,356 meters, is one of the peaks of the central cone of Mount Hakone, located in Hakone, Kanagawa Prefecture.

Also at the summit is the Hakone Motomiya, founded in 1964, the rear shrine of the Hakone Shrine.

See also
Fuji-Hakone-Izu National Park

References

External link

Mountains of Kanagawa Prefecture
Hakone, Kanagawa